The 2021 Professional Women's Bowling Association (PWBA) Tour season had a total of 20 title events scheduled, the most since the 2001 PWBA season. Overall, the season had 16 standard singles title events, three major tournaments (USBC Queens, U.S. Women's Open and PWBA Tour Championship), and the Striking Against Breast Cancer Mixed Doubles tournament (a crossover event with the PBA Tour). All singles events were broadcast on BowlTV, the USBC’s YouTube channel, except for the season-ending PWBA Tour Championship, which was broadcast on CBS Sports Network.

The season kicked off January 19, 2021 in Arlington, Texas with the first of three Classic Series events. Each Classic Series event includes three title tournaments contested in the same location over an eight-day span. The first two tournaments in a Classic Series stop have fully open fields, while the third tournament starts with only the top 24 players in pinfall from the qualifying rounds of the first two tournaments.

On April 29, the PBA announced it was adding an all-women's competition to its King of the Lanes event, which was broadcast live on FS1 on June 15 and 16. (In the 2020 PBA King of the Lanes, two females – Clara Guerrero and Gazmine Mason – participated against an otherwise all-male field.) The King of the Lanes: Empress Edition is a "last person standing" format, where two challengers face each other for a chance to dethrone the reigning Empress over the course of five rounds. Kelly Kulick was chosen as the initial Empress. Challengers included: Clara Guerrero, Daria Pajak, Danielle McEwan, Maria José Rodriguez, Missy Parkin, Diana Zavjalova, Liz Johnson, Ashly Galante, Stefanie Johnson and Verity Crawley.

Season highlights and awards
 On August 10, 2021, Jillian Martin made PWBA Tour history as the youngest player (17) ever to win a PWBA title. Martin, a member of Junior Team USA and the reigning PBA Junior Girls champion, defeated England's Verity Crawley in the final match to win the PWBA BowlTV Classic. The previous record holder for youngest PWBA Tour champion was Wendy Macpherson, who won the 1986 U.S. Women's Open at age 18.
 This season's U.S. Women's Open, held August 24–31, offered a PWBA record $100,000 top prize, won by Josie Barnes.
 With her win at the PWBA Reno Classic on October 26, Stephanie Zavala became the first PWBA Tour rookie to win three titles since Leanne (Barrette) Hulsenberg in 1987. Zavala also locked up the 2021 PWBA Rookie of the Year award following this win.

Player awards
 PWBA Player of the Year: Bryanna Coté
 PWBA Rookie of the Year: Stephanie Zavala

2021 points leaders
1. Bryanna Coté (129,445)
2. Shannon O'Keefe (129,270)
3. Verity Crawley (128,900)

2021 average leaders
1. Shannon O'Keefe (214.73)
2. Shannon Pluhowsky (214.51)
3. Bryanna Coté (213.75)

2021 championship round appearances
T1. Bryanna Coté (6)
T1. Verity Crawley (6)
T1. Dasha Kovalova (6)
T1. Stephanie Zavala (6)

2021 cashes
1. Liz Johnson (18)
T2. Missy Parkin (17)
T2. Maria José Rodriguez (17)

Tournament summary

Below is a list of events that are scheduled for the 2021 PWBA Tour season.  Major tournaments are in bold.

+ Liz Johnson also earned a $10,000 bonus for rolling a 300 game in the semifinal match.

References

External links
 PWBA.com, home of the Professional Women' Bowling Association

2021 in bowling